Chinese church may refer ro:

 Christianity in China
 Protestant (Three-Self Patriotic Movement or House church)
 Catholic (Chinese Patriotic Catholic Association or Underground church)
 Chinese Orthodox Church
 Chinese American church

Chinese diaspora